LA Laguna FC was an American soccer team based in the Los Angeles area, United States. Founded in 2010, the team played in the Premier Development League (PDL) (now USL League Two), the fourth tier of the American Soccer Pyramid, in the Southwest Division of the Western Conference.

The team would play some of its home matches at Santa Ana Stadium and others at Citrus College and Pomona College starting in May 2016.

History
After acquiring the PDL franchise rights to the Springfield Storm franchise that used to play in the PDL out of Springfield, Missouri, the team began life as Los Angeles Storm under head coach Chris Volk, and made their debut in PDL competition in 2010, one of several teams joining the Southwest division as it expanded to nine teams. Playing at Citrus Stadium on the campus of Citrus College in Glendora, California, Storm made an inauspicious start, tying 1–1 with the San Fernando Valley Quakes, but quickly recovered to register impressive back-to-back victories over Fresno Fuego and Bakersfield Brigade. However, Storm's mid-season form proved to be their downfall, as the team slumped to five defeats in six games (including a humiliating 0–4 to the eventual divisional champions Southern California Seahorses), ending their first season playoff hopes. A morale-boosting 5–0 win over Bakersfield Brigade in their penultimate game was a positive, but eventually they finished sixth in the table. David Niemeyer was the Storm's top scorer in their freshman year, scoring 7 goals in his 15 games, while MLS-bound Mexican midfielder Erasmo Solorzano was the assist king with 3. Goalkeeper Lance Friesz was also a standout – so much so, that he was drafted by Los Angeles Galaxy in the offseason.

The Storm's second year began in terrible fashion, suffering a 5–0 defeat to the San Fernando Valley Quakes on the opening day of the season. They did not register their first victory – 2–1 over new boys San Jose Frogs – until their third game, and from then on the Storm's season was one of see-sawing inconsistency. Back-to-back 3–1 wins over Orange County Blue Star and Lancaster Rattlers was followed by a 1–5 disaster at home to Fresno Fuego, which was followed by a 5–1 thrashing of Bakersfield Brigade... and so it went. By the end of the season, Storm were struggling to pick up wins wherever they went, but at least they started seeing some consistency; however, the four ties in their last six games ultimately consigned them to 5th place in the table, outside the playoffs for a second year. Ross Schunk was by far their outstanding goalscorer, tallying goals 10 in a season which included a hat trick at home to Lancaster Rattlers. Alex Bengard registered 5 assists.

2008 saw a name change, with Storm becoming Los Angeles Legends following a merger between two local youth soccer organizations, and a coaching change, with Azusa Pacific soccer coach Phil Wolf taking over the reins from Chris Volk. The Legends started the season in magnificent form, downing Orange County Blue Star 1–0 in their opening game, and then registering two back-to-back 5–0 home victories over Lancaster Rattlers and San Fernando Valley Quakes, the first of which featured a hat-trick from striker Davis Paul. Legends' blistering early-season success saw them qualify for their first ever US Open Cup, where they faced USL2 side (and eventual quarter-finalists) Crystal Palace Baltimore at home in Azusa. Sadly for the Legends their foray into the Cup was a short one, as they were beaten 2–1 off a late winner by Baltimore's Pat Healey. Legends continued the year as high scoring entertainers: they put six past Orange County Blue Star in mid-June, then conceded six away at Fresno Fuego in the very next game. However, as the season wound down, the team's early season form deserted them, as four defeats in their last five games left them out of playoff contention. Legends ended the year a comfortable mid-table 6th; Davis Paul was top scorer, knocking in an impressive 10 goals, and contributing five assists for his strike partner, Ross Schunk.

Legends relocated from the San Gabriel Valley to East Los Angeles in 2009, hired a new head coach in the shape of ex-Chivas USA striker Brent Whitfield, and signed ex-Los Angeles Galaxy defender Mike Randolph to lead a new-look team; the change in fortunes on the field as a result was remarkable. Despite losing their opening two games of the season 3–2 to Lancaster Rattlers and 3–0 to Fresno Fuego, the team bounced back magnificently, and embarked on a 12-game unbeaten run through the middle of the season which kept them in the hunt for the divisional title throughout the year. Legends were the division's high-scoring entertainers; they put six past Lancaster in the return game, hammered Fresno 7–1 on the road, beat Ogden Outlaws 5–0, and overcame Orange County Blue Star 4–3 in a seesaw game in early July. Each of these four games was highlighted by hat tricks from player/coach Brent Whitfield, who would eventually go on to score 14 goals in his 9 appearances for the Legends, good for third nationally. Legends briefly topped the division as the regular season wound down, but a 2–0 loss to Fresno in their penultimate game handed the division to the Hollywood United Hitmen, with whom they had previously been involved in an astonishing 0–0 tie which featured seven red cards. The Legends secured second place in the division, and a first trip to the postseason, with a 1–0 win over Ventura County Fusion, but Fusion got their revenge in the divisional playoff semifinal with a 2–1 victory which ended Los Angeles' title hopes at the first hurdle.

During the 2009–2010 offseason the Legends were bought out by the owners of the long-standing Los Angeles-based amateur side LA Blues, and re-branded themselves as the Los Angeles Azul Legends. The team's new logo was unveiled on their new website in April 2010.

During the 2010–2011 offseason the team re-branded themselves again, this time as the Los Angeles Misioneros. The team's new logo was unveiled on their new website in January 2011.

Players

Current roster
As at April 29, 2012.

Notable former players
This list of notable former players comprises players who went on to play professional soccer after playing for the team in the Premier Development League, or those who previously played professionally before joining the team.

  Joe Barton
  Tony Beltran
  Alex Bengard
  Javier Castro
  Kraig Chiles
  Gabriel Farfan
  Michael Farfan
  Lance Friesz
  Erlys García
  Maxwell Griffin
  Lester Moré
  Kyle Nakazawa
  Davis Paul
  Adrien Perez
  Mike Randolph
  Ross Schunk
  Erasmo Solorzano
  Brent Whitfield
  Gerson Mayen
  Edwin Miranda
  Vincent Weijl
  Mohammed Takiyudin

Year-by-year

Head coaches
  Chris Volk (2006–2007)
  Phil Wolf (2008)
  Brent Whitfield (2009)
  Salvador Moran (2010)
  Lloyd Kinnear (2010)
  Marlon Iván León (2011–2012)
  Ever Morataya (2012–2013)
  Cruz Hernandez (2014)
  Fabian Sandoval (2015–present)

General Managers
  Freddy Avellaneda(Club Administrator) (2011–present)
  Jose Antonio Jimenez (2012–present)
  Daniel Collazo (2014–present)

Stadia
 Citrus Stadium; Glendora, California (2006–2007)
 Cougar Stadium; Azusa, California (2008)
 Keegan Stadium at Bishop Mora Salesian High School; East Los Angeles, California (2009–2010)
 Ayala Stadium; Chino, California 1 game (2009)
 Stadium at Crenshaw High School; Crenshaw, California 4 games (2010–2011)
 Stadium at Morningside High School; Inglewood, California (2011)
 Stadium at George Washington Carver Middle School; Los Angeles, California (2012; 2015–present)
 Stadium at California State University, San Bernardino; San Bernardino, California (2013–2014)
 Stadium at Linda Esperanza Marquez High School- Citrus College- Glendale Sports Complex; Huntington Park-Glendora-Glendale, California (2014)
Santa Ana Stadium (2016)
Stadium at Citrus College (2016)
Stadium at Pomona College (2016)

Average attendance
Attendance stats were calculated by averaging each team's self-reported home attendances from the historical match.

 2006: 338
 2007: 512
 2008: not yet available
 2009: 155
 2010: 716
 2011: not yet available
 2012: not yet available
 2013: not yet available
 2014: 3930

References

External links
Official Site

Association football clubs established in 2010
USL League Two teams
Soccer clubs in Greater Los Angeles
Sports in Santa Ana, California
2010 establishments in California

ko:로스앤젤레스 아줄 레전즈
it:Los Angeles Legends
nl:Los Angeles Legends